The Widelux is a fully mechanical swing-lens panoramic camera first developed in Japan in 1958, by Panon Camera Shoko. There are both 35mm and medium-format models. Instead of a shutter, the camera has a slit that exposes the film as the lens pivots on a horizontal arc. This pivot allows for some distortion effects not available with traditional cameras. The last Widelux model F8 ended production in 2000.

Models

Widelux F series 35mm
 Widelux FI (1959) with Vistar f/2.8 26mm 
 Widelux FV (1959) with Panon f/2.8 26mm
 Widelux FVI (~1964)
 Widelux F6 (~1970)
 Widelux F6B (~1970s)
 Widelux F7 (1979–1988)
 Widelux F8 (1988–2000)

Medium Format model 1500
The medium format Widelux model 1500 make 50x122 mm frames on 120 film, and cover a 150-degree horizontal angle across the long side. It was described as newly introduced in 1988 and cost "about US$4,500" at the time.

Differences 
There are important differences between the F and 1500 series cameras. The 35mm cameras have a set focus (5 ft to infinity), whereas the 1500 Widelux can focus from a bit less than 1m to infinity with seven markers. The 35mm cameras have three shutter speeds, 1/15, 1/125 and 1/250 of a second, whereas the 1500 Widelux has shutter speeds of 1/8, 1/60 and 1/250 of a second. The F series cover a 140 degree view, whereas the 1500 series covers a slightly wider area (150 degree view-diagonally-140 degr.horizontally). Finally, the 1500 Widelux, like most manual film cameras, has a shutter that must be cocked before the camera will fire.  When setting focus below 5m on Widelux 1500 the resolution will be reduced due to optical limitations. There were a lot of problems for the first models in the 90s, uneven rotation, filmplane so buyers are encouraged to test beforehand.

Users
Actor/photographer Jeff Bridges started photographing movie sets with the camera in 1984. In 2003, he published a book of his panoramic pictures called simply "Pictures". Bridges was recognized for his Widelux photography by the International Center of Photography's Infinity Award in 2013.

A few of filmmaker Stanley Kubrick's Widelux photos appear in the book "Stanley Kubrick: A Life in Pictures" by his wife Christiane.

The Widelux has been used on some NASA missions for its 140° coverage.

Similar cameras
Cameras with similar functions include the Noblex and Horizon.

References 

Panoramic cameras
Japanese inventions